The Antrim county football team represents Antrim GAA, the county board of the Gaelic Athletic Association, in the Gaelic sport of football. The team competes in the three major annual inter-county competitions; the All-Ireland Senior Football Championship, the Ulster Senior Football Championship and the National Football League.

Antrim's home ground is Casement Park, Belfast. The team's manager is Andy McEntee.

The team last won the Ulster Senior Championship in 1951, but has never won the All-Ireland Senior Championship or the National League.

History

The county team has won the Ulster Senior Football Championship (SFC) on ten occasions: 1900, 1901, 1908, 1909, 1910, 1911, 1912, 1913, 1946 and 1951.

The county team was the first in the province of Ulster to appear in an All-Ireland Senior Football Championship (SFC) final, doing so in 1911 and repeating the feat again in 1912, but losing on both occasions.

Antrim's 1911 All-Ireland SFC semi-final win was not anticipated. The Ulster secretary got sick that year and did not organise a provincial championship. So Antrim arrived to play Kilkenny without having practiced and won by a scoreline of 3–1 to 1–1. The following year Antrim defeated Kerry. Heavy rain on the day, and over-indulgence at a wedding the day before were blamed for the unexpected 3–5 to 0–2 defeat. Antrim's County Board decision to introduce a City League in 1908, one of the first in Gaelic history, was a more legitimate explanation.

The 1946 Antrim football team was regarded as one of the most exciting of the era, taking advantage of the newly reintroduced handpass. Joe McCallin's two goals contributed to Antrim's defeat of Cavan in the Ulster SFC final. However, Kerry roughed them out of the All-Ireland SFC semi-final.

The opening of Casement Park boosted the sport in Belfast, but — from the late 1960s — the troubles restricted sporting life in the football heartlands of Belfast, particularly in Ardoyne. Political violence meant that the county could not build on the under-21 team of 1969, one of the finest in Ulster history (Din Joe McGrogan — scorer of the goals that put Antrim in the final — was killed by a loyalist bomb). The county's Vocational Schools team has made it to two All-Ireland finals: in 1968, when the team defeated Galway, and in 1971, when Mayo won.

Congregation of Christian Brothers member Laurence (Larry) Ennis (1933-2021) served as Antrim manager from 1979 until 1981, leading the team to a Dr McKenna Cup title, defeating Tyrone, Down and Armagh along the way.

A drawn Ulster SFC semi-final with Derry in 2000 was one of the highlights of Antrim's football at inter-county level, alongside winning the 2008 Tommy Murphy Cup, defeating Wicklow in the final, a reverse of the previous year's final result against the same opponent. Antrim reached the 2009 Ulster SFC final, the first Antrim team to do so for 31 years. Antrim lost that game to 2008 All-Ireland SFC winner Tyrone.

Jody Gormley was named Antrim manager ahead of the 2007 All-Ireland SFC, a role he held for two seasons.

Lenny Harbinson managed the team from 2017 until 2020. He was unable to gain promotion from Division 4 of the National Football League and the county exited the Ulster SFC in its first game in each of his three years, though defeated Louth in an away 2019 All-Ireland SFC qualifier.

In November 2020, Enda McGinley was appointed manager. McGinley brought his former Tyrone teammate Stephen O'Neill in as part of his backroom team and Brendan Murphy was appointed as strength and conditioning coach. McGinley and his backroom team left at the end of May 2022.

Less than two months later, Andy McEntee was unexpectedly appointed as McGinley's successor as manager on a three-year term.

Managerial history

Players

All Stars
Antrim has one All Star.

1971: Andy McCallin

Team sponsorship
Antrim unveiled a sponsorship agreement with Fibrus in December 2022, projected to last five years.

Honours
Official honours, with additions noted.

National
All-Ireland Senior B Football Championship
 Winners (1): 1999
Tommy Murphy Cup
 Winners (1): 2008
 Runners-up (1): 2007

All-Ireland Under-21 Football Championship
 Winners (1): 1969
All-Ireland Vocational Schools Championship
 Winners (1): 1968

ProvincialUlster Senior Football Championship Winners (10): 1900, 1901, 1908, 1909, 1910, 1911, 1912, 1913, 1946, 1951
 Runners-up (9): 1903, 1906, 1918, 1919, 1925, 1926, 1947, 1948, 1970, 2009Dr McKenna Cup Winners (6):  1941, 1942, 1945, 1946, 1966, 1981Dr Lagan Cup Winners (3):''' 1944, 1946, 1948

References

 
County football teams